Britt Mogård (née Östlund; 9 November 1922 – 12 July 2012) was a Swedish politician. She served as a member of the Riksdag from 1969 to 1983, representing Stockholm County for the Moderate Party.

From 1983 to 1988, Mogård was Governor of Kronoberg County. She was also Minister of Schools from 1976 to 1978, and again from 1979 to 1981.

References

Further reading
 

1922 births
2012 deaths
Members of the Riksdag from the Moderate Party
Women members of the Riksdag
Women government ministers of Sweden
20th-century Swedish women politicians
20th-century Swedish politicians